Ceuthelea is a monotypic snout moth genus described by Boris Balinsky in 1994. Its single species, Ceuthelea umtalensis, described in the same publication, is found in South Africa.

References

Endemic moths of South Africa
Phycitinae
Monotypic moth genera
Moths of Africa
Pyralidae genera